Stephen Samuel Gelbart (born June 12, 1946) is an American-Israeli mathematician who holds the Nicki and J. Ira Harris Professorial Chair in mathematics at the Weizmann Institute of Science in Israel. He was named a fellow of the American Mathematical Society in 2013 "for contributions to the development and dissemination of the Langlands program."

Biography
Gelbart was born in Syracuse, New York. He graduated from Cornell University in 1967, and earned a Ph.D. from Princeton University in 1970, with a dissertation on Fourier analysis supervised by Elias M. Stein. He returned to Cornell as an assistant professor in 1971, was promoted to full professor in 1980, moved to the Weizmann Institute in 1984, and was given his named chair in 1998. He was president of the Israel Mathematical Union from 1994 to 1996. His doctoral students include Erez Lapid.

Selected publications

Articles
Harmonics on Stiefel manifolds and generalized Hankel transforms. Bull. Amer. Math. Soc. 78 (1972) 451–455. 
A theory of Stiefel harmonics. Trans. Amer. Math. Soc. 192 (1974) 29–50. 
An elementary introduction to the Langlands program. Bull. Amer. Math. Soc. 10 (1984) 177–219. 
with Freydoon Shahidi: Boundedness of automorphic L-functions in vertical strips. J. Amer. Math. Soc. 14 (2001) 79–107. 
with Stephen D. Miller: Riemann's zeta function and beyond. Bull. Amer. Math. Soc. 41 (2004) 59–112.

Books

with Ilya Piatetski-Shapiro and Stephen Rallis: 
with Freydoon Shahidi:

as editor
 with Joseph Bernstein as editor and 6 contributing authors:

References

External links
Home page

1946 births
Living people
20th-century American mathematicians
21st-century American mathematicians
Israeli mathematicians
Cornell University alumni
Princeton University alumni
Cornell University faculty
Academic staff of Weizmann Institute of Science
Fellows of the American Mathematical Society